Filene's Department Store was a department store building at 426 Washington Street in Downtown Crossing, Boston, Massachusetts.  It was the flagship store of the Filene's department store chain.  The building has been renovated and now serves as the offices for Havas and Arnold Worldwide. The building is maintained as part of the Millennium Tower. It is now home to fast fashion retailer, Primark.

History

Development and use

The building was completed in 1912 as a new flagship location for William Filene and Sons' department store, better known as Filene's. By 1929 Filene's expanded the flagship building, converting the whole block around Washington, Summer, Hawley and Franklin streets into one department store.  This was the last major project by legendary Chicago architect Daniel Burnham and his only work in Boston.  This building was widely regarded as one of the best examples of Beaux Arts architecture in Boston.

In 1986, the Filene's Building was added to the National Register of Historic Places.  In 2006, Filene's stores were merged with Macy's phasing out the Filene's name.  In a normal store merger, the old stores are converted into the new stores. But this was a problem in Boston, because the Filene's building was located across the street from another Macy's store.  When Filene's did close, the Boston Landmarks Commission unanimously voted to protect two of the historic buildings that housed Filene's in Boston.  The two oldest buildings were protected including the main 1912 Filene's store building and a 1905 former glassware and china seller's building on the opposite corner.  Two newer buildings, built in 1951 and 1973, were not protected, and were demolished in 2008.

Sale and refurbishment

After the store closed, the building was marketed and was eventually bought by Vornado Realty Trust of New York. Vornado teamed up with Gale International for a $700 million redevelopment of the Filene's site.  The project contained a 39-story tower including a 280-room hotel, 125-seat restaurant,  of office space, 166 residential condos,  of retail space, and an adjacent park. Although the Filene's Building is protected by the Landmarks Commission, it only protected the facade of the buildings. This allowed the developers of the site to rip out the building's interior, leaving the exterior to stand on its own. However, when the project ran out of money, the site was left completely gutted and missing walls from the razed 1951 and 1973 additions. The city of Boston eventually revoked the permit on the project.

The site was taken over by another developer, Millennium Partners of New York. Plans include  of retail on the lower floors and nearly  office space on the upper floors, including a restoration of many original architectural details. The project also includes a glass tower next door, which will contain 450 luxury residences and another  of retail space.

Irish clothing company Primark opened its first U.S. store September 10, 2015, on the first four floors of the restored Burnham Building; Roche Bros. supermarket occupies the basement, with an additional grab-and-go shop at street level on Summer Street.  Havas and Arnold Worldwide occupy floors 5-8.

See also

Millennium Tower (Boston, Massachusetts)
National Register of Historic Places listings in northern Boston, Massachusetts

References

External links

Entry on Emporis
Skyscraperpage.com forum on One Franklin Street
 City of Boston, Landmarks Commission. Filene's Complex Study Report, 2006
Article from The Brickbuilder (1912) with floor plans

Commercial buildings completed in 1911
Commercial buildings on the National Register of Historic Places in Massachusetts
Department stores on the National Register of Historic Places
Retail buildings in Massachusetts
National Register of Historic Places in Boston
1911 establishments in Massachusetts
Skyscraper office buildings in Boston
Skyscraper hotels in Boston
Residential skyscrapers in Boston